Anvar Khatamovich Kuchmuradov (born 5 January 1970) is a former Uzbekistani sprinter who competed in the men's 100m competition at the 1996 Summer Olympics. He recorded a 10.71, not enough to qualify for the next round past the heats. His personal best is 9.90, set in 1994. In the 2000 Summer Olympics, he was on the Uzbekistani 4 × 100 m relay team, which placed 8th in their heat with a 41.20.

References

1970 births
Uzbekistani male sprinters
Athletes (track and field) at the 1996 Summer Olympics
Athletes (track and field) at the 2000 Summer Olympics
Olympic athletes of Uzbekistan
Living people
Athletes (track and field) at the 1994 Asian Games
Asian Games competitors for Uzbekistan